Guignardia philoprina is a plant pathogen that causes leaf spot on Araliaceae sp.

References

External links
 Photo at the Fungi4Schools page of the British Mycological Society

Fungal plant pathogens and diseases
Botryosphaeriaceae
Fungi described in 1859